Galärvarvskyrkogården (literally Galley Shipyard Cemetery) is a cemetery on the island of Djurgården in Stockholm, Sweden. It has about 1,300 burial sites and an area of approximately 0.9 hectares.

History
Galärvarvskyrkogården in Djurgården was established in 1742 and was the last in a series of landscaped cemeteries for naval use. Recently, an encircling wall and a memorial grove has been built. In 1963 the remains of ten men and two women found on the salvaged wreckage of Vasa was buried here.

Layout
It has about 1,300 burial sites and an area of approximately 0.9 hectares. The cemetery, which is strongly influenced by naval life both in individual monuments and symbols as well as inscriptions, has a chapel and a bell tower. At the cemetery one can be reminded about dramatic events in Swedish history.

Monument
At Galärvarvskyrkogården there are monument to the foundering of Vasa, the Battle of Svensksund and the Hårsfjärden disaster during World War II. In addition to people of the navy, there are burial sites for others with a special relationship to the cemetery or the people who promoted its existence. Next to the cemetery is the Estonia Monument ( which sank in 1994), managed by the Royal Djurgården Administration. There is also a memorial stone for the victims of the Catalina affair.

Notable interments

 Stig Anderson
 Pauline Brunius
 Kent Finell
 Anders Franzén
 Hilma af Klint
 Margaretha Krook
 Alf Sjöberg
 Vilgot Sjöman
 Elisabeth Söderström
 Birgit Tengroth
 Per Unckel
 Allan Vougt

Gallery

References

Cemeteries in Sweden
1742 establishments in Sweden
Buildings and structures in Stockholm
Tourist attractions in Stockholm